Nan Kempner (July 24, 1930 – July 3, 2005) was a New York City socialite, reputed for her fashion sense and her philanthropy.

Biography
Born Nan Field Schlesinger in San Francisco, Kempner was the only child in a wealthy family. Her father, Albert "Speed" Schlesinger, who owned the largest car dealership in California, reportedly told his daughter, "You'll never make it on your face, so you'd better be interesting." Kempner started collecting couture clothing when she was a young woman living in San Francisco.

Kempner attended Connecticut College, where she met Thomas Lenox Kempner, a banker and son of publisher Alan H. Kempner as well as grandson of Carl M. Loeb. They married in the early 1950s and had three children. After living in London for a short time, the Kempners moved to New York City, where Nan became a leader in high society.

Kempner, who missed only one runway season in 55 years, was widely considered among the most highly informed authorities in fashion. Over the course of her life, she owned one of the foremost private couture collections in the country, featuring classic designers such as Mainbocher and her favorite designers Yves Saint Laurent and Bill Blass. Her collection preserved some of the iconic outfits of mid-20th century couture. At various times in her life Kempner worked as a contributing editor for French Vogue, a fashion editor for Harper's Bazaar, a design consultant for Tiffany & Co., and an international representative of the auction house Christie's.

Charity Work 
Over 30 years, she helped raise more than $75,000,000 for the Memorial Sloan-Kettering Cancer Center. The proceeds for her 2000 book, R.S.V.P, about good hostess etiquette, had its proceeds go to charity.

In Popular Culture 

 In 1973, she was painted by Andy Warhol.
 In Armistead Maupin's Tales of the City, two society matrons discuss the creation of a society wax museum, concerned that future generations might not otherwise know what Nan Kempner looked like.

Characterizations

 Diana Vreeland, former editor of Vogue: "There are no chic women in America. The one exception is Nan Kempner."
 Valentino said, "Nan always looks so wonderful in my clothes, because she had a body like a hanger."
 Joan Juliet Buck wrote in W that in the 1960s, at a time when women in pants were challenging social mores, Kempner defied the dress code at La Côte Basque, which declined to seat women wearing pants, by removing her trousers.
 A thin elegant blonde, Kempner was said to be the inspiration for the term “social X-ray” in Tom Wolfe's novel Bonfire of the Vanities.

Death and legacy
Kempner died on July 3, 2005, aged 74, from emphysema. She was survived by her husband and three children: Lina Kempner, Thomas Kempner Jr., and James Kempner. Two months later, her family held a memorial service in her honor at the auction house Christie's. Five hundred of her friends were in attendance.

In December 2006, the Metropolitan Museum of Art's Costume Institute exhibited selections from Kempner's couture collection. In 2007, the exhibition was displayed at San Francisco's De Young Museum from June 16 to November 11. Much of the collection went to the Fine Arts Museums of San Francisco, including items by Valentino, Yves Saint Laurent, Karl Lagerfeld for Chanel, and the house of Christian Dior.

Sources
How to Be a Park Avenue Princess

References

1930 births
2005 deaths
American magazine editors
Women magazine editors
American socialites
Connecticut College alumni
Deaths from emphysema
Writers from San Francisco
Jewish American philanthropists
20th-century American philanthropists
Carl M. Loeb family
20th-century American non-fiction writers
20th-century American Jews
21st-century American Jews